Atheists with surnames starting R and S, sortable by the field for which they are mainly known and nationality.

Notes and references

surnames R to S